Danjiangkou is a county-level city in northwestern Hubei, China, bordering Henan province to the northeast. The city spans an area of 3,121 square kilometers, and has a population of approximately 478,000 as of 2017.

Etymology 
Danjiangkou translates to the mouth of the Dan River.

Geography
Danjiangkou is located where the Dan River flows into the Han River.

The city proper is situated near the Danjiangkou Dam on this river.

Climate

History 
The area of present-day Danjiangkou belonged to both the Han and the Chu during the Warring States period. After the Warring States period, the area was conquered by the Qin dynasty, which administered the area as Wudang County, after the nearby Wudang Mountains. Wudang County belonged to the Nanyang Commandery. In 208 CE, the area formed part of the newly established . In 289 CE, under the Jin Dynasty, the area formed part of the newly established . During the Yongjia rebellion, many refugees from present-day Linfen, Shanxi settled in Wudang County. In 618 CE, Wudang County became part of the newly formed Wudang Commandery. In 1119, Wudang Commandery became the Wudang Jun. In 1276, the Wudang Jun became the Jun Prefecture. In 1476, the area was merged into .

The area remained part of the Jun Prefecture until the establishment of the Republic of China in 1912, which re-organized the Jun Prefecture as Jun County. In 1932, it was moved to the province's 11th Administrative Circuit, and was moved to the province's 8th Administrative Circuit in 1936.

On March 21, 1948, the county seat was taken by the People's Liberation Army, and the rest of the county was taken by March 28. On June 2, the Jun County Democratic County Government was established by the Communist Party. With the foundation of the People's Republic of China on October 1, 1949, the county's government was renamed to the Jun County People's Government.

Jun County was briefly revoked in July 1960, and was merged into Guanghua County, before being re-established in 1962. On August 19, 1983, Jun County became the county-level city of Danjiangkou.

Administrative divisions
Danjiangkou is divided into 4 subdistricts, 12 towns, and 5 other township-level divisions. These are subsequently divided into 41 residential communities and 223 administrative villages.

Economy 
In 2017, the city's GDP totaled ¥22.514 billion, the government budget totaled ¥2.089 billion, and foreign trade totaled USD 40.7918 million.

Tourism 
The city received 14.91 million tourists in 2017. The Wudang Mountains, which run through the city, have been designated as a 5A Tourist Attraction. The Danjiangkou Reservoir is also a major tourist attraction, and hosts watersports events and serves as a popular fishing spot.

Transport
The Xiangyang–Chongqing railway and the  both run through the city. Portions of the Wuhan–Shiyan high-speed railway and the Shiyan-Xichuan Expressway are under construction within Danjiangkou as of July 2020.

Danjiangkou is the northwest terminus of the Hankou–Danjiangkou Railway.

References

External links
Old website of the Danjiangkou City People's Government (2008)
Website of the Danjiangkou City People's Government (2020)

Cities in Hubei
County-level divisions of Hubei
Shiyan